The 2017 Canoe Slalom World Cup was a series of five races in canoe slalom organized by the International Canoe Federation (ICF). It was the 30th edition. Before the first World Cup race it was determined that the men's C2 class would be removed from the Olympic program. This resulted in a reduced number of participants in this event. The C2 mixed event was raced for the first time as part of the World Cup in Prague, though only 4 crews entered (3 of them Czech) and no points were awarded. The K1 cross was renamed as Extreme Kayak, but still no world cup points were awarded for the event.

Calendar 

The series opened with World Cup Race 1 in Prague, Czech Republic (June 16–18) and concluded with the World Cup Final in La Seu d'Urgell, Spain (September 8–10).

Standings 
The winner of each race was awarded 60 points (double points were awarded for the World Cup Final for all the competitors who reached at least the semifinal stage). Points for lower places differed from one category to another. Every participant was guaranteed at least 2 points for participation and 5 points for qualifying for the semifinal run (10 points in the World Cup Final). If two or more athletes or boats were equal on points, the ranking was determined by their positions in the World Cup Final.

Incumbent World Cup Champion

Points  
World Cup points were awarded on the results of each race at each event as follows:

Results

World Cup Race 1 

The first World Cup event in Prague, Czech Republic, held from 16 to 18 June, saw the introduction of the C2 mixed class to the World Cup. Only 4 boats entered the event, three of which were from the host nation. No World Cup points were awarded for this event.

Eleven athletes were allowed to start in the men's C1 final after the jury couldn't decide whether the boat of Matej Beňuš was legal. Edern Le Ruyet was the 11th paddler.

World Cup Race 2 

The second race of the series took place at the Augsburg Eiskanal, Germany from 23 to 25 June.

World Cup Race 3 

The third race of the series took place at Kanupark Markkleeberg, Germany from 30 June to 2 July.

World Cup Race 4 

1-3 September in Ivrea, Italy

World Cup Final 

The final race of the series took place at Segre Olympic Park in La Seu d'Urgell, Spain from 8 to 10 September.

See also 
 2017 ICF Canoe Slalom World Championships

References

External links 
 International Canoe Federation

Canoe Slalom World Cup
Canoe Slalom World Cup